George Welsh may refer to:

Politicians
George Austin Welsh (1878–1970), U.S. Representative from Pennsylvania
George Arthur Welsh (1896–1965), Canadian flying ace, farmer and political figure
George W. Welsh (1883–1974), politician from Michigan

Others
George Welsh (Australian footballer) (1896–1983), Australian rules footballer
George Welsh (American football) (1933–2019), American college football coach
George Schlager Welsh (1918–1990), personality researcher

See also
George Welsh Currie (1870–1950), British politician
George Welch (disambiguation)